Smogorzów  (German Schmorgau) is a village in the administrative district of Gmina Namysłów, within Namysłów County, Opole Voivodeship, in south-western Poland.

From 992 to 1327, the village was part of Poland. Since then, until 1741, part of Bohemia (from 1526 within Habsburg monarchy). From 1741 to 1871, it was part of Prussia. Before 1945, the area was part of united Germany (see Territorial changes of Poland after World War II).

References

Villages in Namysłów County